Highway Hunter is vehicular combat game developed by Omega Integral Systems for MS-DOS compatible operating systems. It was published by the Safari Software label of Epic MegaGames in 1994.

Plot
A hostile alien race has conquered the earth and enslaved the human race to do their bidding. The player assumes the role of a man who has worked in an alien maintenance garage, steals a prototype alien combat vehicle called the MASTER and escapes with it. The MASTER is used to fight the alien forces in a desperate bid to save the planet.

Gameplay
The game uses a top-down view. The player's car is situated on a raised highway. The ground is visible on the sides. The player's car is constantly moving upwards through the level, though the player can maneuver the car around the screen within the boundaries of the highway. The player fires at enemies that come from the top of the screen. There are ground enemies on the highway and flying enemies that can come in from the sides or the top. Some enemies may drop weapon power ups, which make the player car's projectiles stronger or more numerous. The game is divided into three episodes, each with a number of levels, with a boss at the end of each level. The highway environments start out looking earthly, but the player moves into more alien levels later in the game.

Reception
Allgame gave a 2 and a half star rating,

References

External links

1994 video games
DOS games
DOS-only games
Vehicular combat games
Video games developed in Russia